Arthur Rosenblat Nestrovski (born December 26, 1959) is a Brazilian composer, guitarist, literary and musical critic, writer and editor. He was artistic director of the São Paulo State Symphony Orchestra (Osesp) from 2010 to 2022; and artistic director of the Campos do Jordão Festival from 2012 to 2022.

Life and career
He graduated in Music from the University of York in 1983. He has a PhD in Literature and Music from the University of Iowa, USA, in 1990. From 1992 to 2009 he served as a classical music critic for the Folha de S.Paulo newspaper ; and from 1999 to 2009 he was editor of PubliFolha. From 1991 to 2005 he was a professor in the postgraduate course in Communication and Semiotics at PUC / SP; he abandoned his university career to dedicate himself more intensively to music.

He performs regularly with artists such as Zé Miguel Wisnik, Zélia Duncan, Adriana Calcanhotto and Paula Morelenbaum, in Brazil and abroad (Germany, Portugal, Poland).

Renowned also as an author of children's books, he received the Jabuti Prize for Fiction Book of the Year , in 2003, for Bichos Que Existem e Bichos Que Não Existem.

References

External links 
Official site (in Portuguese)

1959 births
Living people
Brazilian composers
Brazilian literary critics
Brazilian children's writers
People from Porto Alegre
Brazilian editors